Schillsdorf is a municipality in the district of Plön, in Schleswig-Holstein, Germany.

Schillsdorf is located about 10 km east of Neumünster, and about 5 km west of the Bundesautobahn 21 (extension to the federal highway 404) from Kiel to Bad Segeberg on the former railway line from Neumünster to Plon.

References

Municipalities in Schleswig-Holstein
Plön (district)